Terrana may refer to:

 Anna Terrana, Canadian politician
 Mike Terrana, American drummer
 Phil Terrana, better known as Steve McCoy, an American radio show host
 Ralph Terrana, record producer
 Terrana, a futuristic realm in the Xyber 9: New Dawn animated television series